The 905 Derby is a soccer rivalry between Canadian Premier League clubs, Forge FC and York United FC, both based in Southern Ontario. The rivalry gets the "905" nickname from the 905 area code, which encompasses both Hamilton and York Region. Forge and York United were the only Ontario-based teams in the inaugural season of the league and remain the two closest in proximity, with less than  separating their home stadiums.

History
In January 2019, the Canadian Premier League announced that its inaugural match on April 27, 2019, would be between Forge FC and York United FC (then known as York9 FC) at Tim Hortons Field, the first-ever staging of the 905 Derby. The match ended in a 1–1 draw.

On November 21, 2021, Forge hosted York in the first CPL playoff meeting of the two clubs. Forge defeated York 3–1 to advance to the 2021 Canadian Premier League Final.

Statistics

Results

League ranking by season

Records

Top goalscorers 

Players in bold are still active players with the team.

Players who played for both clubs

Forge, then York
  Jace Kotsopoulos
  Molham Babouli

Discipline

See also 
 Al Classico
 Canadian Classique
 Cavalry FC–Forge FC rivalry

References 

Forge FC
York United FC
Soccer in Ontario
Soccer rivalries in Canada
2019 establishments in Ontario
Canadian Premier League